The African terrestrial barbets are the bird genus Trachyphonus in the African barbet family (Lybiidae), which was formerly included in the Capitonidae and sometimes in the Ramphastidae. These birds are more terrestrial than the other African barbets and differ in some other respects too; they are thus separated in a monotypic subfamily Trachyphoninae.

Species in taxonomic sequence
The genus contains 6 extant species:
 Yellow-billed barbet, Trachyphonus purpuratus
 Crested barbet, Trachyphonus vaillantii
 Yellow-breasted barbet, Trachyphonus margaritatus
 Red-and-yellow barbet, Trachyphonus erythrocephalus
 D'Arnaud's barbet, Trachyphonus darnaudii
Usambiro barbet, Trachyphonus usambiro

Extinct taxa
The Early to Middle Miocene genus Capitonides from Europe, as well as "CMC 152", a distal carpometacarpus from the Middle Miocene locality of Grive-Saint-Alban (France), have been placed in this genus, but this move is not widely accepted. In the case of "CMC 152", this may be more warranted as this fragment differs from Capitonides and is more similar to extant (presumably Old World) barbets.

References

 
Bird genera
Barbets
Taxa named by Camillo Ranzani
Taxonomy articles created by Polbot